It's All About to Change is the second studio album by American country music singer Travis Tritt, released on Warner Bros. Records in 1991. The tracks "The Whiskey Ain't Workin'", "Nothing Short of Dying", "Anymore", and "Here's a Quarter (Call Someone Who Cares)" were released as singles; "Bible Belt" also charted from unsolicited airplay. "Anymore" was the second single of Tritt's career to reach Number One on the Hot Country Songs charts. Overall, this is Tritt's highest-certified album; with sales of over three million copies in the U.S., it has been certified 3× Platinum by the RIAA. He recorded the song "Bible Belt" for My Cousin Vinny in collaboration with the band Little Feat, and this placement gained him some exposure.

Track listing

Personnel
From It's All About to Change liner notes.

Musicians
 Chris Austin - mandolin (2), banjo (2), backing vocals (2)
 Sam Bacco - timpani (3, 4), percussion (3, 4, 9), marimba (7), maracas (7), congas (9)
 Grace Bahng - cello (9)
 Richard Bennett - electric guitar (1, 2, 3, 4, 7, 10),  tic tac bass (6), acoustic guitar (8), twelve-string guitar (8), Danelectro (8)
 Mike Brignardello - bass guitar (except 5)
 Larry Byrom - acoustic guitar (1, 2, 3, 4, 6, 7, 8, 9), slide guitar (10)
 John Cowan - backing vocals (2, 4, 5)
 Wendell Cox - electric guitar (2, 4)
 Terry Crisp - steel guitar (1, 4, 6, 7)
 David Davidson - violin (9)
 Stuart Duncan - fiddle (1, 2, 4, 7, 8)
 Paul Franklin - pedal steel guitar (8), baritone steel guitar (8), The Box (8, 9)
 Jack Holder - electric guitar (9, 10)
 Bernie Leadon - acoustic guitar (2), electric guitar (4), mandola (9), mandocello (9)
 Chris Leuzinger - acoustic guitar (7), Dobro (7)
 Dennis Locorriere - backing vocals (1, 10)
 Mac McAnally - acoustic guitar (3, 6)
 Dana McVicker - backing vocals (3, 5, 10)
 Phil Madeira - Hammond B-3 organ (4)
 Edgar Meyer - conductor (9)
 Mark O'Connor - fiddle (6)
 Bobby Ogdin - piano (3, 6), harpsichord (3)
 Tim Passmore - backing vocals (1, 2, 4)
 Bill Payne - piano (2, 8, 10), Hammond B-3 organ (10)
 Hargus "Pig" Robbins - piano (7)
 Matt Rollings - piano (1, 4, 9)
 Jimmy Joe Ruggiere - harmonica (1, 2, 4, 5, 6, 8, 10)
 Russell Smith - backing vocals (4)
 Marty Stuart - electric guitar (1), vocals (1)
 Chris Teal - violin (9)
 Travis Tritt - lead vocals (all tracks)
 Tanya Tucker - backing vocals (9)
 Steve Turner - drums (except 5), cowbell (10)
 Billy Joe Walker Jr. - electric guitar (1, 2, 4, 6, 8, 10), acoustic guitar (3, 7, 8, 9)
 Kris Wilkinson - viola (9)
 Dennis Wilson - backing vocals (6, 7, 8)
 Curtis Young - backing vocals (6, 7, 8)
 Reggie Young - electric guitar (2, 3, 6, 7, 8, 10)

"The C.M.B. singers" on "Bible Belt": Kimberly Hughes, Matlen Latson, Rosa McLore, Helen Plummer, Sandra Prewitt, Patricia Snell, Robin Snell, Cherry Streeter, Lois Streeter, Willie Streeter, Christine Weston

Little Feat, as featured on "Bible Belt"
 Paul Barrere - electric and slide guitars
 Sam Clayton - congas, tambourine
 Kenny Gradney - bass guitar
 Richie Hayward - drums
 Bill Payne - piano, Hammond organ
 Fred Tackett - electric guitar

Technical
 Gregg Brown - production
 Carlos Grier - digital editing
 Chris Hammond - recording, mixing (6, 7, 9)
 John Hampton - mixing (except 6, 7, 9)
 Mike Poole - engineering
 Denny Purcell - mastering
 Clarke Schleicher - engineering
 Alan Schulman - engineering

Charts

Weekly charts

Year-end charts

References

1991 albums
Travis Tritt albums
Warner Records albums